The Center for Election Science (CES) is an American 501(c)(3) electoral reform advocacy organization. It advocates for cardinal voting methods such as approval voting and score voting. Its goal is to implement approval voting in at least five cities with 50,000 people by 2022.

CES argues that approval voting is superior to other proposed electoral reforms, such as ranked choice voting; it says approval voting will elect more consensus winners, which it contends traditional runoffs and instant-runoff ranked methods don't allow, because they eliminate candidates with broad support but low first-preference support.

Center for Election Science helped pass approval voting in the city of Fargo, North Dakota, during the 2018 elections and in St. Louis, Missouri, in 2020, with the help of St. Louis Approves,.

History 
CES was founded in 2011. It has received two grants from Open Philanthropy: $598,600 in December 2017, and $1.8 million in February 2019. It is considered to be a rooted in effective altruism.

See also

 FairVote
 The Equal Vote Coalition

References

Electoral reform groups in the United States
Political advocacy groups in the United States
501(c)(3) organizations
2011 establishments in the United States
Organizations established in 2011